Bernd Sturm (born 17 May 1952) is a German former football player and manager, who played as a defender.

References

1962 births
Living people
German footballers
Association football defenders
KSV Hessen Kassel players
2. Bundesliga players
German football managers
KSV Hessen Kassel managers